Etiquette in Society, in Business, in Politics, and at Home (frequently referenced as Etiquette) is a book authored by Emily Post in 1922. The book covers manners and other social rules, and has been updated frequently to reflect social changes, such as diversity, redefinitions of family, and mobile technology. The 19th edition of Etiquette (2017), is authored by Post's descendants Lizzie Post and Daniel Post Senning.

Legacy
The sociologist Erving Goffman drew for his studies of ritual in everyday life on what he called Post as "a good source of half-analysed material...in the ritual idiom of a hypothetical class".
Joan Didion commended Emily Post for the practical wisdom of her chapter on Funerals (Ch XXIV), especially in relation to the physiology of grief and distress.

See also
Pierre Bourdieu
Politeness

References

External links

 public domain electronic version in the Gutenberg library

1922 non-fiction books
Self-help books
Etiquette